Aleksei Valeryevich Sobolev (16 January 1968 – 15 November 2001) was a Russian footballer who played as a defender.

References

1968 births
2001 deaths
Soviet footballers
Association football defenders
FC Shakhtar Pavlohrad players
FC Okean Nakhodka players
Russian footballers
Russian Premier League players
FC Luch Vladivostok players